Labeo sorex is a species of cyprinid fish from the genus Labeo found in rapids of the Congo River Basin in Africa.

References 

sorex
Fish described in 1917
Cyprinid fish of Africa